Castel Morrone is a comune (municipality) in the Province of Caserta in the Italian region Campania, located about  north of Naples and about  north of Caserta.

Castel Morrone borders the following municipalities: Caiazzo, Capua, Caserta, Limatola, Piana di Monte Verna.

References

External links
 Official website

Cities and towns in Campania